Wang Hongwen (December 1935 – 3 August 1992) was a Chinese labour activist and politician who was the youngest member of the "Gang of Four." He rose to prominence during the Cultural Revolution (1966–1976), after organizing the Shanghai People's Commune, to become one of the foremost members of national leadership of the Chinese Communist Party (CCP).

At the pinnacle of his power he was the second Vice Chairman of the CCP, and ranked third in the Communist Party's hierarchy. Following Mao's death in 1976, Wang was arrested and charged with "counterrevolutionary activity," then sentenced to life imprisonment in 1981.

Biography 
Wang was born in a village in the outskirts of Changchun, Jilin province. In the early 1950s he took part in the Korean War. He joined the Chinese Communist Party in 1953. After the war, he was sent to Shanghai to work in Shanghai No. 17 Cotton Textile Mill as the head of its security guards regiment, where he met Zhang Chunqiao and became involved in a Red Guards group. He organized the Shanghai Commune in January 1967, and was catapulted to national prominence as a daring rebel leader.

At the 9th National Congress of the Chinese Communist Party, Wang was elected a member of the Central Committee. Following the Lin Biao incident, Wang was put in charge of the investigation into the case in the Shanghai area, reporting directly to Mao. At the 10th National Congress of the CCP in 1973, Wang, at the age of 38, was elevated to second ranking Vice Chairman in the Central Committee, and a member of the Politburo Standing Committee, making him the third-highest-ranking member of the CCP, behind Chairman Mao Zedong and Premier Zhou Enlai. All signs pointed to Wang being trained as Mao's successor.

Wang was rumored to be slated to become Premier after then-Premier Zhou Enlai's death in January 1976. However, Hua Guofeng, a more moderate figure, was chosen to succeed Zhou instead. Wang was an important player during and after the death of Mao, and served as the masters of ceremonies for his funeral service on national radio on 18 September 1976. On October 6, 1976, Hua Guofeng and Ye Jianying pretended to hold a meeting in Zhongnanhai's Huairen Hall to discuss the fifth volume of Mao Zedong's Selected Works, and informed the members of the Gang of Four to come and discuss. When Wang arrived, his personal guards were asked to stay outside the courtyard, and when several agents from the Central Security Bureau twisted him in the corridor, he shouted, "I'm here for the meeting, what are you doing?" with punching and kicking the agents. Wang came to the hall with his arms twisted, and Hua began to read out the "decision" of the CCP Central Committee to him, but unexpectedly during the reading Wang broke away from the agents and shouted and lunged at Ye Jianying, who was present, but was subdued again before he could reach him. According to historian Immanuel C.Y. Hsü, the coup was not completely bloodless – Wang killed two of the agents trying to capture him, and was wounded himself before being subdued. He was tried and sentenced to life imprisonment in 1981. He died of liver cancer in a Beijing hospital on 3 August 1992, at the age of 56.

Wang was one of the youngest members of the Politburo Standing Committee in the post-revolution Communist Party, having joined the body aged 37. He was the same age as some standing committee members who took office even after the turn of the century, such as Luo Gan (served on the PSC between 2002 and 2007), who was also born in 1935.

References

External links 

 Wang Hongwen Archive at the Marxist Internet Archive.

1935 births
1992 deaths
Politicians from Changchun
People of the Cultural Revolution
Chinese Communist Party politicians from Jilin
Gang of Four
Members of the 10th Politburo Standing Committee of the Chinese Communist Party
Anti-revisionists
Expelled members of the Chinese Communist Party
Chinese politicians convicted of crimes
Deaths from liver cancer
Chinese Marxists
People's Republic of China politicians from Jilin
Deaths from cancer in the People's Republic of China
Chinese military personnel of the Korean War